Christian Gandu (born 1 July 1992) is a Congolese professional footballer who plays in the Netherlands for Magreb '90, as a midfielder.

Career
Gandu played youth football for Utrecht, Borussia Dortmund and Groningen, before making his professional debut in the 2010–11 Eerste Divisie season for Almere City.

References

1992 births
Living people
Republic of the Congo footballers
Republic of the Congo expatriate footballers
Almere City FC players
Eerste Divisie players
Expatriate footballers in the Netherlands
Magreb '90 players
Association football midfielders